Ma Jin (born 7 May 1988) is a badminton player from China who specialises in women's and mixed doubles. She partnered Wang Xiaoli in women's doubles and excelled in the category until 2010 when both players are split after China failed to defend their Uber Cup against South Korea in Kuala Lumpur. Consequently, Ma Jin was unable to continue competing in the women's doubles event without her regular partner and she had to concentrate on mixed doubles instead. Ma Jin had tasted successes in mixed with several partners, notably Zheng Bo, He Hanbin and Xu Chen. Her domination at the front of the court combined with the power play from Xu Chen made them one of the most dominant Chinese pairs to date, the other being Zhang Nan and Zhao Yunlei.

Her career success includes an Olympic silver medal in mixed doubles with Xu Chen at the London 2012 Olympics and a World Championship title which she won with a different partner, Zheng Bo in 2010 at Paris.

Achievements

Olympic Games 
Mixed doubles

BWF World Championships 
Women's doubles

Mixed doubles

Asian Games 
Mixed doubles

Asian Championships 
Women's doubles

Mixed doubles

East Asian Games 
Women's doubles

Mixed doubles

BWF World Junior Championships 
Girls' doubles

Mixed doubles

Asian Junior Championships 
Girls' doubles

BWF Superseries 
The BWF Superseries, which was launched on 14 December 2006 and implemented in 2007, is a series of elite badminton tournaments, sanctioned by the Badminton World Federation (BWF). BWF Superseries levels are Superseries and Superseries Premier. A season of Superseries consists of twelve tournaments around the world that have been introduced since 2011. Successful players are invited to the Superseries Finals, which are held at the end of each year.

Women's doubles

Mixed doubles

  BWF Superseries Finals tournament
  BWF Superseries Premier tournament
  BWF Superseries tournament

BWF Grand Prix 
The BWF Grand Prix had two levels, the BWF Grand Prix and Grand Prix Gold. It was a series of badminton tournaments sanctioned by the Badminton World Federation (BWF) which was held from 2007 to 2017.

Women's doubles

Mixed doubles

  BWF Grand Prix Gold tournament
  BWF Grand Prix tournament

References

External links 
 

1988 births
Living people
Sportspeople from Nantong
Badminton players from Jiangsu
Chinese female badminton players
Badminton players at the 2012 Summer Olympics
Badminton players at the 2016 Summer Olympics
Olympic badminton players of China
Olympic silver medalists for China
Olympic medalists in badminton
Medalists at the 2012 Summer Olympics
Badminton players at the 2010 Asian Games
Badminton players at the 2014 Asian Games
Asian Games gold medalists for China
Asian Games bronze medalists for China
Asian Games medalists in badminton
Medalists at the 2010 Asian Games
Medalists at the 2014 Asian Games
World No. 1 badminton players